Harold Jacob Smith (July 2, 1912 – December 28, 1970) was an American screenwriter. His screenplay for The Defiant Ones won the Academy Award for Best Original Screenplay in 1958.

Filmography

Films

TV

References

External links

1912 births
1970 deaths
Writers from New York City
American male screenwriters
Best Original Screenplay Academy Award winners
Edgar Award winners
Screenwriters from New York (state)
20th-century American male writers
20th-century American screenwriters